The University Consortium for Geographic Information Science (UCGIS) is an academic non-profit organization dedicated to geographic information science, incorporated in 1995 in Washington, D.C.

It fosters multidisciplinary cooperation among the academic disciplines of cartography, cognitive science, computer science, engineering and land surveying, environmental sciences, geodetic science, geography, landscape architecture, law and public policy, remote sensing and photogrammetry, as well as statistics.

See also
 Geographic Information Science and Technology Body of Knowledge
National Center for Geographic Information and Analysis

References

Further reading

External links

1995 establishments in the United States
Research institutes established in 1995
Educational institutions established in 1995
Geographic data and information organizations in the United States